Sanogasta is a genus of South American anyphaenid sac spiders first described by Cândido Firmino de Mello-Leitão in 1941.

Species
 it contains fifteen species:
Sanogasta alticola (Simon, 1896) — Peru, Bolivia, Argentina
Sanogasta approximata (Tullgren, 1901) — Chile, Argentina
Sanogasta backhauseni (Simon, 1895) — Chile, Argentina, Uruguay
Sanogasta b. patagonicus (Simon, 1905) — Argentina
Sanogasta bonariensis (Mello-Leitão, 1940) — Argentina
Sanogasta maculatipes (Keyserling, 1878) — Peru, Bolivia, Brazil, Uruguay, Argentina, Chile. Introduced to Easter Is.
Sanogasta maculosa (Nicolet, 1849) — Chile, Argentina, Juan Fernandez Is.
Sanogasta mandibularis Ramírez, 2003 — Argentina, Paraguay
Sanogasta minuta (Keyserling, 1891) — Brazil, Argentina
Sanogasta paucilineata (Mello-Leitão, 1945) — Argentina
Sanogasta pehuenche Ramírez, 2003 — Chile, Argentina
Sanogasta puma Ramírez, 2003 — Brazil, Uruguay, Argentina
Sanogasta rufithorax (Tullgren, 1902) — Chile
Sanogasta tenuis Ramírez, 2003 — Brazil, Argentina
Sanogasta x-signata (Keyserling, 1891) — Brazil, Uruguay, Argentina

References

External links

Anyphaenidae
Araneomorphae genera